Purpose is the end for which something is done, created or for which it exists. It is part of the topic of intentionality and goal-seeking behavior.

Related concepts and subjects:
 Goal, a desired result or possible outcome
 Intention, the state of intending something or the action intended
 Motivation, a driving factor for actions, willingness, and goals
 Determination or resolve
 Purpose clause, in grammar a dependent adverbial clause expressing purpose
 Purpose of life, questions regarding the significance of living or existence in general
 Teleology, the philosophical attempt to describe things in terms of their apparent purpose or goal
 Teleonomy, the apparent purposefulness of structures and functions in living organisms

Music
Purpose (Algebra album), 2008
Purpose (Justin Bieber album), or the title song, 2015
Purpose (Taeyeon album), 2019

Film
 Purpose (film), a 2001 American independent drama thriller film

People
 Darryl Purpose, American singer-songwriter

See also 
 Accidentally on Purpose (disambiguation)
 All-purpose (disambiguation)
 Dual-purpose (disambiguation)
 General-purpose (disambiguation)
 Multi-purpose (disambiguation)
 On Purpose (disambiguation)
 Single-purpose (disambiguation)
 Goal (disambiguation)
 Target (disambiguation)